The 2017 Banja Luka Challenger was a professional tennis tournament played on clay courts. It was the sixteenth edition of the tournament which was part of the 2017 ATP Challenger Tour. It took place in Banja Luka, Bosnia and Herzegovina from 11 to 17 September 2017.

Singles main-draw entrants

Seeds

 1 Rankings are as of 28 August 2017.

Other entrants
The following players received wildcards into the singles main draw:
  Daniel Gimeno Traver
  Franjo Raspudić
  Nino Serdarušić
  Kento Tagashira

The following player received entry into the singles main draw as a special exempt:
  Kevin Krawietz

The following players received entry into the singles main draw as alternates:
  André Ghem
  Alexandre Müller

The following players received entry from the qualifying draw:
  Filip Horanský
  Lucas Miedler
  Péter Nagy
  Pol Toledo Bagué

The following players received entry as lucky losers:
  Erik Crepaldi
  Andreas Haider-Maurer

Champions

Singles

 Maximilian Marterer def.  Carlos Taberner 6–1, 6–2.

Doubles

 Marin Draganja /  Tomislav Draganja def.  Danilo Petrović /  Ilija Vučić 6–4, 6–2.

External links
Official Website

2017 in Bosnia and Herzegovina sport
Banja Luka Challenger
Banja Luka Challenger
Banja Luka Challenger